This is a list of counties of Ireland ordered by population. Counties in the Republic of Ireland are shown in normal type, while those in Northern Ireland are listed in italic type. Non-traditional administrative counties are indicated by a cream-coloured background.

For a more detailed analysis of current and historical Irish populations in the Republic of Ireland, see Irish population analysis. The population of the six counties of Northern Ireland as of 2021 is 1,903,100 which would mean a total population on the island of Ireland as of 2022 of approximately 7,026,636

Data source (as of June 2022):
Taken from latest census data for the Republic of Ireland and Northern Ireland.
Population data for counties in the Republic of Ireland is based on preliminary data from census of 2022.
Population data for counties in Northern Ireland is based on census of 2011.
The previous census for the Republic of Ireland was taken in 2016, the previous census for Northern Ireland was taken in 2001.
Density updated as of 2016

See also 
 Demographics of the Republic of Ireland
 Irish Population Analysis
 List of Irish counties by area
 List of Irish counties by highest point
 List of Irish counties by coastline

Notes
 The populations of Dublin, Cork, Galway, Limerick and Waterford cities have been added to their respective traditional counties. For a list of these cities by population see, List of towns in the Republic of Ireland by population. For more information on city status, see City status in Ireland.

References

Demographics of Ireland
Population
Counties, population
Ranked lists of country subdivisions